Richard Hermann Ratka (born 26 November 1963) is a German former handball player. He was a member of the Germany men's national handball team. He was part of the team at the 1992 Summer Olympics, playing six matches. On club level he played for TuRU Düsseldorf in Düsseldorf.

References

1963 births
Living people
German male handball players
Handball players at the 1992 Summer Olympics
Olympic handball players of Germany
Sportspeople from Dortmund
20th-century German people
21st-century German people